The Fairy Faith is a Canadian documentary film, directed by John Walker and released in 2000. The film is an exploration of the history of fairy imagery and folklore.

A shorter television edition of the film premiered on February 10, 2000, as an episode of the CBC Television documentary series Witness, prior to a full 75-minute version premiering at the 2001 Hot Docs Canadian International Documentary Festival.

The film received a Genie Award nomination for Best Feature Length Documentary at the 21st Genie Awards in 2001.

References

External links
 

2000 films
2000 documentary films
Canadian documentary films
Films directed by John Walker
National Film Board of Canada documentaries
Films about fairies and sprites
2000s English-language films
2000s Canadian films